Gianluca Pierobon (born 2 March 1967, in Gallarate) is an Italian former racing cyclist.

Palmares

1985
1st  Junior National Road Race Championships
1st Trofeo Buffoni
1991
1st Stage 2b Giro d'Italia
1994
1st Stage 4 Vuelta a Aragón
3rd Overall Tour de Suisse
1st Stage 4
1995
1st Stage 5 Tirreno–Adriatico

References

1967 births
Living people
Italian male cyclists
People from Gallarate
Cyclists from the Province of Varese
Tour de Suisse stage winners